The women's 400 metres T13 event at the 2020 Summer Paralympics in Tokyo, took place between 2–4 September 2021.

Records
Prior to the competition, the existing records were as follows:

Results

Heats
Heat 1 took place on 2 September 2021, at 21:21:

Heat 2 took place on 2 September 2021, at 21:29:

Heat 3 took place on 2 September 2021, at 21:37:

Final
The final took place on 4 September 2021, at 10:08:

References

Women's 400 metres T13
2021 in women's athletics